John Joseph Conroy (July 25, 1819 – November 20, 1895) was an Irish-born clergyman of the Roman Catholic Church. He served as Bishop of Albany from 1865 to 1877.

Biography
John Conroy was born in Clonaslee, Queen's County, and came to the United States at the age of twelve. After studying under the Sulpicians at the College of Montreal, he made his theological studies at Mount St. Mary's Seminary in Emmitsburg, Maryland, and at St. John's College in Fordham, New York.

He was ordained to the priesthood by Bishop John Hughes on May 21, 1842. He was appointed vice-president of St. John's College in 1843, becoming president shortly afterward. In 1844, he was transferred to the pastorate of St. Joseph's Church in Albany, where he established St. Vincent's Orphan Asylum, erected a convent for the Sisters of Charity, and rebuilt the parish church. He became vicar general of the Diocese of Albany in 1857.

On July 7, 1865, Conroy was appointed the second Bishop of Albany by Pope Pius IX. He received his episcopal consecration on the following October 15 from Archbishop John McCloskey, with Bishops John Timon and John Loughlin serving as co-consecrators. During his administration, he greatly increased the number of priests in the diocese, securing the services of the Augustinians and the Conventual Franciscans. Among the many institutions he founded were an industrial school, St. Agnes's Rural Cemetery, St. Peter's Hospital, and a house for the Little Sisters of the Poor. On June 28, 1868 Conroy laid the cornerstone for a new hospital building for Troy Hospital (later known as St. Mary's).

He convoked the second diocesan synod, and attended the Plenary Councils of Baltimore and the First Vatican Council.

After twelve years as Bishop of Albany, he resigned due to ill health on October 16, 1877; he was named Titular Bishop of Curium on the same date. He made his residence in New York City, where he later died at age 76. His funeral was held at the Cathedral of the Immaculate Conception, after which he was laid to rest in the crypt.

References

1819 births
1895 deaths
People from County Laois
Irish emigrants to the United States (before 1923)
19th-century Irish Roman Catholic priests
19th-century Roman Catholic bishops in the United States
Fordham University alumni
Mount St. Mary's University alumni
Roman Catholic bishops of Albany
American Roman Catholic clergy of Irish descent